The 2015 NHL Entry Draft was the 53rd NHL Entry Draft. The draft was held on June 26–27, 2015, at the BB&T Center in Sunrise, Florida. The first three selections were Connor McDavid going to the Edmonton Oilers, Jack Eichel going to the Buffalo Sabres, and Dylan Strome going to the Arizona Coyotes.

Eligibility
Ice hockey players born between January 1, 1995, and September 15, 1997, were eligible for selection in the 2015 NHL Entry Draft. Additionally, undrafted, non-North American players born in 1994 were eligible for the draft, and those players who were drafted in the 2013 NHL Entry Draft, but not signed by an NHL team and who were born after June 30, 1995, were also eligible to re-enter the Draft.

Draft lottery
Since the 2012–13 season, all 14 teams not qualifying for the Stanley Cup playoffs have a "weighted" chance at winning the first overall selection. Beginning with the 2014–15 season, the NHL changed the weighting system that was used in previous years. Under the new system, the odds of winning the draft lottery for the four lowest finishing teams in the League decreased, while the odds for the other non-playoff teams increased. The Edmonton Oilers won the 2015 draft lottery that took place on April 18, 2015, thus moving them from the third overall pick to the first overall pick.

Top prospects
Source: NHL Central Scouting final (April 8, 2015) ranking.

Selections by round
The order of the 2015 Entry Draft is listed below.

Round one

Notes
 The Los Angeles Kings' first round pick went to the Boston Bruins as the result of a trade on June 26, 2015 that sent Milan Lucic to Los Angeles in exchange for Martin Jones, Colin Miller and this pick.
 The Calgary Flames' first-round pick went to the Boston Bruins as the result of a trade on June 26, 2015 that sent Dougie Hamilton to Calgary in exchange for Calgary and Washington's second-round picks in 2015 (45th and 52nd overall) and this pick.
 The Pittsburgh Penguins' first-round pick went to the New York Islanders as the result of a trade on June 26, 2015 that sent Griffin Reinhart to Edmonton in exchange for a second-round pick in 2015 (33rd overall) and this pick.
Edmonton previously acquired this pick as the result of a trade on January 2, 2015 that sent David Perron to Pittsburgh in exchange for Rob Klinkhammer and this pick.
 The New York Islanders' first-round pick went to the Ottawa Senators as the result of a trade on June 26, 2015 that sent Robin Lehner and David Legwand to Buffalo in exchange for this pick.
Buffalo previously acquired this pick as the result of a trade on October 27, 2013 that sent Thomas Vanek to New York in exchange for Matt Moulson, a second-round pick in 2015 and this pick (being conditional at the time of the trade). The condition – Buffalo will receive a first-round pick in 2014 or 2015 at New York's choice – was converted on May 22, 2014 when the Islanders elected to keep their 2014 first-round pick.
 The Nashville Predators' first-round pick went to the Philadelphia Flyers as the result of a trade on June 26, 2015 that sent Tampa Bay's first-round pick in 2015 (29th overall) and Chicago's second-round pick in 2015 (61st overall) to Toronto in exchange for this pick.
Toronto previously acquired this pick as the result of a trade on February 15, 2015 that sent Cody Franson and Mike Santorelli to Nashville in exchange for Olli Jokinen, Brendan Leipsic and this pick.
 The St. Louis Blues' first-round pick went to the Winnipeg Jets as the result of a trade on February 11, 2015 that sent Evander Kane, Zach Bogosian and Jason Kasdorf to Buffalo in exchange for Tyler Myers, Drew Stafford, Joel Armia, Brendan Lemieux and this pick (being conditional at the time of the trade). The condition – Winnipeg will receive the lowest of Buffalo's first-round picks in 2015 – was converted on April 27, 2015 when the Islanders were eliminated from the 2015 Stanley Cup playoffs, ensuring that the Blues' first-round pick would be lower.
 Buffalo previously acquired this pick as the result of a trade on February 28, 2014 that sent Ryan Miller, Steve Ott and conditional second and third-round picks in 2014 to St. Louis in exchange for Jaroslav Halak, Chris Stewart, William Carrier, a conditional first-round pick in 2014 and this pick.
 The New York Rangers' first-round pick went to the New York Islanders as the result of a trade on June 26, 2015 that sent Edmonton's second-round pick in 2015 (33rd overall) and Florida's third-round pick in 2015 (72nd overall) to Tampa Bay in exchange for this pick.
Tampa Bay previously acquired this pick as the result of trade on March 5, 2014 that sent Martin St. Louis and a conditional second-round pick in 2015 to New York in exchange for Ryan Callahan, a conditional first-round pick in 2014, a conditional seventh-round pick in 2015 and this pick.
 The Tampa Bay Lightning's first-round pick went to the Columbus Blue Jackets as the result of a trade on June 26, 2015 that sent Toronto's second-round pick in 2015 (34th overall) and Philadelphia's third-round pick in 2015 (68th overall) to Toronto in exchange for this pick.
Toronto previously acquired this pick as the result of a trade on June 26, 2015 that sent Nashville's first-round pick in 2015 (24th overall) to Philadelphia in exchange for Chicago's second-round pick in 2015 (61st overall) and this pick.
Philadelphia previously acquired this pick as the result of a trade on March 2, 2015 that sent Braydon Coburn to Tampa Bay in exchange for Radko Gudas, a third-round pick in 2015 and this pick (being conditional at the time of the trade). The condition – Philadelphia will receive the Lightning's first-round draft pick in 2015 if it is not the first overall selection – was converted on March 30, 2015 when Tampa Bay qualified for the 2015 Stanley Cup playoffs ensuring that this pick could not be a lottery selection.
 The Chicago Blackhawks' first-round pick went the Arizona Coyotes as the result of a trade on February 28, 2015 that sent Antoine Vermette to Chicago in exchange for Klas Dahlbeck and this pick.

Round two

Notes
 The Buffalo Sabres' second-round pick went to the San Jose Sharks as the result of a trade on June 27, 2015 that sent a second-round pick in 2015 (39th overall), Colorado's second-round pick in 2016 and Colorado's sixth-round pick in 2017 to Colorado in exchange for this pick.
Colorado previously acquired this pick from as the result of a trade on June 26, 2015 that sent Ryan O'Reilly and Jamie McGinn to Buffalo in exchange for Nikita Zadorov, Mikhail Grigorenko, J. T. Compher and this pick.
 The Edmonton Oilers' second-round pick went to the Tampa Bay Lightning as the result of a trade on June 26, 2015 that sent the Rangers' first-round pick in 2015 (28th overall) to the New York Islanders in exchange for Florida's third-round pick in 2015 (72nd overall) and this pick.
The Islanders previously acquired this pick as the result of a trade on June 26, 2015 that sent Griffin Reinhart to Edmonton in exchange for Pittsburgh's first-round pick in 2015 (16th overall) and this pick.
 The Toronto Maple Leafs' second-round pick was re-acquired as the result of a trade on June 26, 2015 that sent Tampa Bay's first-round pick in 2015 (29th overall) to Columbus in exchange for Philadelphia's third-round pick in 2015 (68th overall) and this pick.
Columbus previously acquired this pick as the result of a trade on March 5, 2014 that sent Marian Gaborik to Los Angeles in exchange for Matt Frattin, a conditional third-round pick in 2014 and this pick.
Los Angeles previously acquired this pick as the result of a trade on June 23, 2013 that sent Jonathan Bernier to Toronto in exchange for Ben Scrivens, Matt Frattin and this pick (being conditional at the time of the trade). The condition – Los Angeles will receive a second-round pick in 2014 or 2015 at Toronto's choice – was converted on January 18, 2014 when Toronto's second-round pick in 2014 was traded to the Anaheim Ducks.
 The New Jersey Devils' second-round pick went to the Ottawa Senators as the result of a trade on June 27, 2015 that sent Dallas' second-round pick in 2015 (42nd overall) and a conditional third-round pick in 2016 to New Jersey in exchange for this pick.
 The Philadelphia Flyers' second-round pick went to the Boston Bruins as the result of a trade on October 4, 2014 that sent Johnny Boychuk to New York in exchange for a second-round pick in 2016, a conditional third-round pick in 2015 and this pick.
The Islanders previously acquired this pick as the result of a trade March 4, 2014 that sent Andrew MacDonald to Philadelphia in exchange for Matt Mangene, a third-round pick in 2014 and this pick.
 The San Jose Sharks' second-round pick went to the Colorado Avalanche as the result of a trade on June 27, 2015 that sent Buffalo's second-round pick in 2015 (31st overall) to San Jose in exchange for Colorado's second-round pick in 2016, Colorado's sixth-round pick in 2017 and this pick.
 The Florida Panthers' second-round pick went to the New York Rangers as the result of a trade on June 27, 2015 that sent Carl Hagelin and a second and sixth-round pick in 2015 (59th and 179th overall) to Anaheim in exchange for Emerson Etem and this pick.
Anaheim previously acquired this pick as the result of a trade on June 26, 2015 that sent Kyle Palmieri to New Jersey in exchange for a third-round pick in 2016 and this pick.
New Jersey previously acquired this pick as the result of a trade on February 26, 2015 that sent Jaromir Jagr to Florida in exchange for a conditional third-round pick in 2016 and this pick.
 The Dallas Stars' second-round pick went to the New Jersey Devils as the result of a trade on June 27, 2015 that sent a second-round pick in 2015 (36th overall) to Ottawa in exchange for a conditional a third-round pick in 2016 and this pick.
Ottawa previously acquired this pick as the result of a trade on July 1, 2014 that sent Jason Spezza and Ludwig Karlsson to the Stars in exchange for Alex Chiasson, Nick Paul, Alex Guptill and this pick.
 The Los Angeles Kings' second-round pick was re-acquired as the result of a trade on March 5, 2014 that sent Hudson Fasching and Nicolas Deslauriers to Buffalo in exchange for Brayden McNabb, Jonathan Parker, Los Angeles' second-round pick in 2014 and this pick.
 Buffalo previously acquired this pick as the result of a trade on April 1, 2013 that sent Robyn Regehr to Los Angeles in exchange for a second-round pick in 2014 and this pick.
 The Boston Bruins' second-round pick went to the Tampa Bay Lightning as the result of a trade on March 2, 2015 that sent Brett Connolly to Boston in exchange for a second-round pick in 2016 and this pick.
 The Calgary Flames' second-round pick went to the Boston Bruins as the result of a trade on June 26, 2015 that sent Dougie Hamilton to Calgary in exchange for a first-round pick in 2015 (15th overall), Washington's second-round pick in 2015 (52nd overall) and this pick.
 The Detroit Red Wings' second-round pick went to the Dallas Stars as the result of a trade on March 1, 2015 that sent Erik Cole and a conditional third-round pick in 2015 to Detroit in exchange for Mattias Janmark, Mattias Backman and this pick.
 The New York Islanders' second-round pick went to the Buffalo Sabres as the result of a trade on October 27, 2013 that sent Thomas Vanek to New York in exchange for Matt Moulson, a conditional first-round pick in 2014 and this pick.
 The Washington Capitals' second-round pick went to the Boston Bruins as the result of a trade on June 26, 2015 that sent Dougie Hamilton to Calgary in exchange for a first and second-round pick in 2015 (15th and 45th overall) and this pick.
Calgary previously acquired this pick as the result of a trade on March 1, 2015 that sent Curtis Glencross to Washington in exchange for a third-round pick in 2015 and this pick.
 The Vancouver Canucks' second-round pick went to the Calgary Flames as the result of a trade on March 2, 2015 that sent Sven Baertschi to Vancouver in exchange for this pick.
 The Chicago Blackhawks received the 24th pick of this round (54th overall) as compensation for not signing 2010 first-round draft pick Kevin Hayes.
 The Montreal Canadiens' second-round pick went to the Washington Capitals as the result of a trade on June 27, 2015 that sent Buffalo's third-round pick in 2015 (62nd overall) and a fourth-round pick in 2015 (113th overall) to New York in exchange for this pick.
The Rangers previously acquired this pick as the result of a trade on June 27, 2015 that sent Cam Talbot and a seventh-round pick in 2015 (209th overall) to Edmonton in exchange for Ottawa's third-round pick in 2015 (79th overall), a seventh-round pick in 2015 (184th overall) and this pick.
Edmonton previously acquired this pick as the result of a trade on March 2, 2015 that sent Jeff Petry to Montreal in exchange for a conditional fifth-round pick in 2015 and this pick.
 The Anaheim Ducks' second-round pick went to the Columbus Blue Jackets as the result of a trade on March 2, 2015 that sent James Wisniewski and Detroit's third-round pick in 2015 to Anaheim in exchange for Rene Bourque, William Karlsson and this pick.
 The New York Rangers' second-round pick went to the Anaheim Ducks as the result of a trade on June 27, 2015 that sent Emerson Etem and Florida's second-round pick in 2015 (41st overall) to New York in exchange for Carl Hagelin, a sixth-round pick in 2015 (179th overall) and this pick.
 The Tampa Bay Lightning's second-round pick went to the Calgary Flames as the result of a trade on June 27, 2015 that sent Calgary and Washington's third-round picks both in 2015 (76th and 83rd overall) to Arizona in exchange for this pick.
Arizona previously acquired this pick, as the result of a trade on March 1, 2015 that sent Keith Yandle, Chris Summers and a fourth-round pick in 2016 to New York in exchange for John Moore, Anthony Duclair, a conditional first-round pick in 2016 and this pick.
The Rangers previously acquired this pick as the result of a trade March 5, 2014 that sent Ryan Callahan, a conditional first-round pick in 2014, a first-round pick in 2015, and a conditional seventh-round pick in 2015 to Tampa Bay in exchange for Martin St. Louis and this pick (being conditional at the time of the trade). The condition – the Rangers will receive a second-round pick in 2015 if Callahan is re-signed by Tampa Bay for the 2014–15 NHL season – was converted on June 25, 2014 when Tampa Bay signed Callahan to a six-year contract.
 The Chicago Blackhawks' second-round pick went to the Toronto Maple Leafs as the result of a trade on June 26, 2015 that Nashville's first-round pick in 2015 (24th overall) to Philadelphia in exchange for Tampa Bay's first-round pick in 2015 (29th overall) and this pick.
Philadelphia previously acquired this pick as the result of a trade on February 27, 2015 that sent Kimmo Timonen to Chicago in exchange for a conditional fourth-round pick in 2016 and this pick.

Round three

Notes
 The Buffalo Sabres' third-round pick went to the New York Rangers as the result of a trade on June 27, 2015 that sent Montreal's second-round pick in 2015 (57th overall) to Washington in exchange for and a fourth-round pick in 2015 (113th overall) and this pick.
Washington previously acquired this pick as the result of a trade on March 5, 2014 that sent Michal Neuvirth and Rostislav Klesla to Buffalo in exchange for Jaroslav Halak and this pick.
 The Edmonton Oilers' third-round pick went to the Tampa Bay Lightning as the result of a trade on November 28, 2014 that sent Eric Brewer to Anaheim in exchange for this pick.
Anaheim previously acquired this pick as the result of a trade on March 4, 2014 that sent Viktor Fasth to Edmonton in exchange for a fifth-round pick in 2014 and this pick.
 The Carolina Hurricanes' third-round pick went to the Vancouver Canucks as the result of a trade on June 27, 2015 that sent Eddie Lack to Carolina in exchange for a seventh-round pick in 2016 and this pick.
 The Philadelphia Flyers' third-round pick went the Toronto Maple Leafs as the result of a trade on June 26, 2015 that sent Tampa Bay's first-round pick in 2015 (29th overall) to Columbus in exchange for Toronto's second-round pick in 2015 (34th overall) and this pick.
Columbus previously acquired this pick as the result of a trade on April 3, 2013 that sent Steve Mason to Philadelphia in exchange for Michael Leighton and this pick.
 The San Jose Sharks' third-round pick went to the Philadelphia Flyers as the result of a trade on July 2, 2014 that sent Tye McGinn to San Jose in exchange for this pick.
 The Florida Panthers' third-round pick went to the Tampa Bay Lightning as the result of a trade on June 26, 2015 that sent the Rangers' first-round pick in 2015 (28th overall) to the New York Islanders in exchange for Edmonton's second-round pick in 2015 (33rd overall) and this pick.
The Islanders previously acquired this pick as the result of a trade on June 28, 2014 that sent a third-round pick in 2014 to Florida in exchange for this pick.
 The Dallas Stars' third-round pick went to the Detroit Red Wings as the result of a trade on March 1, 2015 that sent Mattias Janmark, Mattias Backman, and a second-round pick in 2015 to Dallas in exchange for Erik Cole and this pick (being conditional at the time of the trade). The condition – Detroit will receive a third-round pick in 2015 if they do not qualify for the 2015 Eastern Conference Final and Cole does not play in 50% of Detroit's playoff games – was converted on April 8, 2015 when Cole was injured for the remainder of the season.
 The Calgary Flames' third-round pick went to the Arizona Coyotes as the result of a trade on June 27, 2015 that sent Tampa Bay's second-round pick in 2015 (60th overall) to Calgary in exchange for Washington's third-round pick in 2015 (83rd overall) and this pick.
 The Pittsburgh Penguins' third-round pick went to the Florida Panthers as the result of a trade on March 5, 2014 that sent Marcel Goc to Pittsburgh in exchange for a fifth-round pick in 2014 and this pick.
 The Ottawa Senators' third-round pick went to the New York Rangers as the result of a trade on June 27, 2015 that sent Cam Talbot and a seventh-round pick in 2015 (209th overall) to Edmonton in exchange for Montreal's second-round pick in 2015 (57th overall), a seventh-round pick in 2015 (184th overall) and this pick.
Edmonton previously acquired this pick as the result of a trade on March 5, 2014 that sent Ales Hemsky to Ottawa in exchange for a fifth-round pick in 2014 and this pick.
 The Detroit Red Wings' third-round pick went to the Anaheim Ducks as the result of a trade on March 2, 2015 that sent Rene Bourque, William Karlsson and a second-round pick in 2015 to Columbus in exchange for James Wisniewski and this pick.
Columbus previously acquired this pick as the result of a trade on June 28, 2014 that sent Edmonton's third-round pick in 2014 to Detroit in exchange for a third-round pick in 2014 and this pick.
 The Minnesota Wild's third-round pick went to the Arizona Coyotes as the result of a trade on January 14, 2015 that sent Devan Dubnyk to Minnesota in exchange for this pick.
 The Washington Capitals' third-round pick went to the Arizona Coyotes as the result of a trade on June 27, 2015 that sent Tampa Bay's second-round pick in 2015 (60th overall) to Calgary in exchange for a third-round pick in 2015 (76th overall) and this pick.
Calgary previously acquired this pick as the result of a trade on March 1, 2015 that sent Curtis Glencross to Washington in exchange for a second-round pick in 2015 and this pick.
 The Vancouver Canucks' third-round pick went to the Anaheim Ducks as the result of a trade on June 27, 2014 that sent Nick Bonino, Luca Sbisa and a first and third-round pick in 2014 to Vancouver in exchange for Ryan Kesler and this pick.
 The St. Louis Blues' third-round pick went the San Jose Sharks as compensation for Edmonton hiring Todd McLellan as their head coach on May 19, 2015.
Edmonton previously acquired this pick as the result of a trade on July 10, 2013 that sent Magnus Paajarvi, a second-round pick in 2014 and a fourth-round pick in 2015 to St. Louis in exchange for David Perron and this pick.
 The Anaheim Ducks' third-round pick went to the Florida Panthers as the result of a trade on February 28, 2015 that sent Tomas Fleischmann to Anaheim in exchange for Dany Heatley and this pick.
 The Tampa Bay Lightning's third-round pick went to the Philadelphia Flyers as the result of a trade on March 2, 2015 that sent Braydon Coburn to Tampa Bay in exchange for Radko Gudas, a conditional first-round pick in 2015 and this pick.

Round four

Notes
 The Arizona Coyotes' fourth-round pick went to the Carolina Hurricanes as the result of a trade on February 28, 2015 that sent Tim Gleason to Washington in exchange for Jack Hillen and this pick.
Washington previously acquired this pick as the result of a trade on March 4, 2014 that sent Martin Erat and John Mitchell to Phoenix in exchange for Rostislav Klesla, Chris Brown and this pick.
 The Edmonton Oilers' fourth-round pick went to the St. Louis Blues as the result of a trade on July 10, 2013 that sent David Perron and a third-round pick in 2015 to Edmonton in exchange for Magnus Paajarvi, a second-round pick in 2014 and this pick.
 The Columbus Blue Jackets' fourth-round pick went to the Los Angeles Kings as the result of a trade on June 27, 2015 that sent a fourth-round pick in 2015 (104th overall) and a sixth-round pick in 2016 to Philadelphia in exchange for this pick.
Philadelphia previously acquired this pick as the result of a trade on June 23, 2014 that sent Scott Hartnell to Columbus in exchange for R. J. Umberger and this pick.
 The San Jose Sharks' fourth-round pick went to the Nashville Predators as the result of a trade on June 28, 2014 that sent Detroit's second-round pick in 2014 to San Jose in exchange for a second-round pick in 2014 and this pick.
 The Los Angeles Kings' fourth-round pick went to the Philadelphia Flyers as the result of a trade on June 27, 2015 that sent Columbus' fourth-round pick in 2015 (99th overall) to Los Angeles in exchange for a sixth-round pick in 2016 and this pick.
 The Calgary Flames' fourth-round pick went to the San Jose Sharks as the result of a trade on July 2, 2013 that sent TJ Galiardi to Calgary in exchange for this pick.
 The Pittsburgh Penguins' fourth-round pick went to the Ottawa Senators as the result of a trade on June 27, 2015 that sent Eric Gryba to Edmonton in exchange for Travis Ewanyk and this pick.
Edmonton previously acquired this pick as the result of a trade on June 27, 2015 that sent Martin Marincin to Toronto in exchange for Brad Ross and this pick.
Toronto previously acquired this pick as the result of a trade on February 25, 2015 that sent Daniel Winnik to Pittsburgh in exchange for Zach Sill, a second-round pick in 2016 and this pick.
 The Washington Capitals' fourth-round pick went to the New York Rangers as the result of a trade on June 27, 2015 that sent Montreal's second-round pick in 2015 (57th overall) to Washington in exchange for and Buffalo's third-round pick in 2015 (62nd overall) and this pick.
 The Montreal Canadiens' fourth-round pick went to the Edmonton Oilers as the result of a trade on March 2, 2015 that sent Jeff Petry to Montreal in exchange for a second-round pick in 2015 and this pick (being conditional at the time of the trade). The condition – Edmonton will receive a fourth-round pick in 2015 if Montreal advances to the second round of the 2015 Stanley Cup playoffs – was converted on April 26, 2015 when Montreal eliminated Ottawa in the first-round of the 2015 Stanley Cup playoffs.
 The Anaheim Ducks' fourth-round pick went to the Tampa Bay Lightning as the result of a trade on June 29, 2014 that sent Nate Thompson to Anaheim in exchange for a seventh-round pick in 2015 and this pick.

Round five

Notes
 The New Jersey Devils' fifth-round pick went to the St. Louis Blues as the result of a trade on March 22, 2013 that sent Matt D'Agostini and a seventh-round pick in 2015 to New Jersey in exchange for this pick (being conditional at the time of the trade). The condition – If D'Agostini is not re-signed by New Jersey then St. Louis will receive a fifth-round pick in 2015 – was converted on July 10, 2013.
 The Colorado Avalanche's fifth-round pick went to the Montreal Canadiens as the result of a trade on June 30, 2014 that sent Daniel Briere to Colorado in exchange for P.A. Parenteau and this pick.
 The Boston Bruins' fifth-round pick went to the Minnesota Wild as the result of a trade on June 27, 2015 that sent a fifth-round pick in 2016 to Boston in exchange for this pick.
 The Winnipeg Jets' fifth-round pick went to the Carolina Hurricanes as the result of a trade on February 25, 2015 that sent Jiri Tlusty to Winnipeg in exchange for a third-round pick in 2016 and this pick (being conditional at the time of the trade). The condition – Carolina will receive a fifth-round pick in 2015 if Winnipeg qualifies for the 2015 Stanley Cup playoffs – was converted on April 9, 2015.
 The Minnesota Wild's fifth-round pick went to the Columbus Blue Jackets as the result of a trade on March 2, 2015 that sent Jordan Leopold to Minnesota in exchange for Justin Falk and this pick.
 The New York Islanders' fifth-round pick went to the San Jose Sharks as the result of a trade on June 5, 2014 that sent Dan Boyle to New York in exchange for this pick (being conditional at the time of the trade). The condition – San Jose will receive a fifth-round pick in 2015 if Boyle is not re-signed by the Islanders for the 2014–15 NHL season – was converted on July 1, 2014.
 The Montreal Canadiens' fifth-round pick went to the New York Islanders as the result of a trade on June 27, 2015 that sent a fifth-round pick in 2016 to Florida in exchange for this pick.
Florida previously acquired this pick as the result of a trade on March 4, 2014 that sent Mike Weaver to Montreal in exchange for this pick.
 The New York Rangers' fifth-round pick went to the Vancouver Canucks as the result of a trade on March 5, 2014 that sent Raphael Diaz to New York in exchange for this pick.

Round six

Notes
 The Arizona Coyotes' sixth-round pick went to the Tampa Bay Lightning as the result of a trade on June 29, 2014 that sent Sam Gagner and B. J. Crombeen to Arizona in exchange for this pick.
 The Los Angeles Kings' sixth-round pick went the Chicago Blackhawks as the result of a trade on July 16, 2013 that sent Daniel Carcillo to Los Angeles in exchange for this pick (being conditional at the time of the trade). The condition – Chicago will receive a sixth-round pick in 2015 if Carcillo plays less than 40 games with Los Angeles during the 2013–14 NHL season – was converted on January 4, 2014 when Carcillo was traded to the New York Rangers after playing only 26 games with the Kings.
 The Ottawa Senators' sixth-round pick went to the Carolina Hurricanes as the result of a trade on December 18, 2014 that sent Jay Harrison to Winnipeg in exchange for this pick.
Winnipeg previously acquired this pick as the result of a trade on June 28, 2014 that sent a seventh-round pick in 2014 to Ottawa in exchange for this pick.
 The New York Rangers' sixth-round pick went to the Anaheim Ducks as the result of a trade on June 27, 2015 that sent Emerson Etem and Florida's second-round pick in 2015 (41st overall) to New York in exchange for Carl Hagelin, a second-round pick in 2015 (59th overall) and this pick.

Round seven

Notes
 The Edmonton Oilers' seventh-round pick went to the New York Rangers as the result of a trade on June 27, 2015 that sent Cam Talbot and a seventh-round pick in 2015 (209th overall) to Edmonton in exchange for a Montreal's second-round pick in 2015 (57th overall), Ottawa's third-round pick in 2015 (79th overall) and this pick.
 The New Jersey Devils' seventh-round pick went to the Los Angeles Kings as the result of a trade on June 30, 2013 that sent a seventh-round pick in 2013 to New Jersey in exchange for this pick.
 The Dallas Stars' seventh-round pick went to the San Jose Sharks as the result of a trade on June 27, 2015 that sent Antti Niemi to Dallas in exchange for this pick.
 The Washington Capitals' seventh-round pick went to the Winnipeg Jets as the result of a trade on June 28, 2014 that sent Edward Pasquale and a sixth-round pick in 2014 to Washington in exchange for a sixth-round pick in 2014, Nashville's seventh-round pick in 2014 and this pick.
 The Vancouver Canucks' seventh-round pick went to the Minnesota Wild as the result of a trade on June 28, 2014 that sent a third-round pick in 2014 to Tampa Bay in exchange for a third-round pick in 2014 and this pick.
 Tampa Bay previously acquired this pick as the result of a trade on June 27, 2014 that sent a second-round pick in 2014 to Vancouver in exchange for Jason Garrison, the rights to Jeff Costello and this pick.
 The St. Louis Blues' seventh-round pick went to the Florida Panthers as the result of a trade on September 28, 2013 that sent Scott Timmins and a sixth-round pick in 2014 to New Jersey in exchange for Krys Barch and this pick.
 New Jersey previously acquired this pick as the result of a trade on March 22, 2013 that sent a conditional fourth-round pick to St. Louis in exchange for Matt D'Agostini and this pick.
 The Anaheim Ducks' seventh-round pick went to the Edmonton Oilers as the result of a trade on June 27, 2015 that sent Dallas' seventh-round pick in 2016 to Tampa Bay in exchange for this pick.
Tampa Bay previously acquired this pick as the result of a trade on June 29, 2014 that sent Nate Thompson to Anaheim in exchange for a fourth-round pick in 2015 and this pick.
 The New York Rangers' seventh-round pick went to the Edmonton Oilers as the result of a trade on June 27, 2015 that sent Montreal's second-round pick in 2015 (57th overall), Ottawa's third-round pick in 2015 (79th overall) and a seventh-round pick in 2015 (184th overall) to New York in exchange for Cam Talbot and this pick.
The Rangers previously re-acquired this pick as the result of a trade on June 1, 2015 that sent Daniel Walcott to Tampa Bay in exchange for this pick.
Tampa Bay previously acquired this pick as the result of a trade March 5, 2014 that sent Martin St. Louis and a conditional second-round pick in 2015 to New York in exchange for Ryan Callahan, a conditional first-round pick in 2014, a first-round pick in 2015, and this pick (being conditional at the time of the trade). The condition – Tampa Bay will receive a seventh-round pick in 2015 if Callahan is re-signed by Tampa Bay for the 2014–15 NHL season – was converted on June 25, 2014 when Tampa Bay signed Callahan to a six-year contract.
 The Tampa Bay Lightning's seventh-round pick went to the Vancouver Canucks as the result of a trade on June 27, 2015 that sent Patrick McNally to San Jose in exchange for this pick.
San Jose previously acquired this pick as the result of a trade on March 2, 2015 that sent Tyler Kennedy to New York in exchange for this pick (being conditional at the time of the trade). The condition – San Jose will receive a seventh-round pick in 2015 if the Islanders do not win the 2015 Stanley Cup and Kennedy does not play in 50% of the Islanders playoff games – was converted on April 27, 2015 when the Islanders were eliminated from the playoffs.
The Islanders previously acquired this pick as the result of a trade on June 28, 2014 that sent a seventh-round pick in 2014 to Tampa Bay in exchange for a seventh-round pick in 2014 and this pick.

Draftees based on nationality

North American draftees by state/province

See also
 2012–13 NHL transactions
 2013–14 NHL transactions
 2014–15 NHL transactions
 2015–16 NHL transactions
 2015–16 NHL season
 List of first overall NHL draft picks
 List of NHL players

References

External links
2015 NHL Entry Draft player stats at The Internet Hockey Database

National Hockey League Entry Draft
NHL Entry Draft
NHL Entry Draft
Sports in Sunrise, Florida